Plaisir Moyo Bahamboula (born 8 January 1991) is a French former professional footballer who played as a midfielder. He is now a musical artist, and his stage name is OhPlai.

Club career 
Bahamboula played for US Grigny, Linas-Montlhéry, and Sochaux in his youth career. He would go on to play 34 games and score 3 goals for the B team of Sochaux from 2008 to 2011. He would then successively play for Royal Antwerp, Viry-Châtillon, MyPa, Slavia Sofia, and Viry-Châtillon again from 2011 to 2015, making sporadic appearances along the way.

In January 2016, Bahamboula signed for Sénart-Moissy. In the second half of the 2015–16 season, he would make a total of 3 appearances. He would decide to retire at the end of the season.

International career 
Born in France, Bahamboula was of Congolese descent. He was a youth player for France at U19 level. He was part of the same generation of footballers as Alexandre Lacazette and Clément Grenier. Bahamboula made only 3 appearances and scored 1 goal for the team.

Musical career 
After retiring from football, Bahamboula pursued a career in making humorous videos on social media. He would gain over 1 million followers across several platforms. He would also become a musical artist, and made several musical videos.

Personal life
Plaisir’s younger brothers Dylan, Dolan, and Jason Bahamboula are footballers. His cousin Yven Moyo is a professional footballer as well.

Bahamboula is muslim.

Honours 
Sochaux U19

 Coupe Gambardella runner-up: 2009–10

References

External links
 

1991 births
Living people
Association football midfielders
French footballers
France youth international footballers
French sportspeople of Republic of the Congo descent
French expatriate footballers
ESA Linas-Montlhéry players
FC Sochaux-Montbéliard players
Royal Antwerp F.C. players
ES Viry-Châtillon players
Myllykosken Pallo −47 players
PFC Slavia Sofia players
US Sénart-Moissy players
Championnat National 2 players
Veikkausliiga players
First Professional Football League (Bulgaria) players
Championnat National 3 players
Expatriate footballers in Bulgaria
Expatriate footballers in Finland
Rappers from Essonne
French rappers
People from Corbeil-Essonnes
Footballers from Essonne
Black French sportspeople